Amerila thermochroa is a moth of the subfamily Arctiinae. It was described by George Hampson in 1916. It is found in the Democratic Republic of the Congo, Kenya, Rwanda, Tanzania and Uganda.

References

 , 1916: Descriptions of new species of the family Arctiadae in the British Museum. Novitates Zoologicae 23 (2): 230-240.
 , 1997: A revision of the Afrotropical taxa of the genus Amerila Walker (Lepidoptera, Arctiidae). Systematic Entomology 22 (1): 1-44.

Moths described in 1916
Amerilini
Moths of Africa
Insects of Uganda
Insects of Rwanda
Insects of Tanzania